Football has been played consistently at the Mediterranean Games since the year 1951 for men. Italy and Spain is the most successful team. From 1991, national teams are not allowed, which means only youth teams participate in the tournament.

Tournament

Men's

 A round-robin tournament determined the final standings.

Medals (1951-2022)

Participating nations

Includes four appearances as

Summary

Men (1951–1987)
As end of 1987 Mediterranean Games. 10 editions compete between Senior teams but many teams not compete national A teams. All matches not between two A Senior team are not counted as A-level match by FIFA.

Men (1951–2022)

See also
Football at the African Games
Football at the Asian Games

External links
 Mediterranean Cup and Mediterranean Games - Overview (www.rsssf.com)
 Mediterranean Games - General stats for all teams

 
F
Mediterranean Games